Empress Quan may refer to:

Empress Quan Huijie, empress of Eastern Wu during the Three Kingdoms
Empress Quan (Song dynasty), wife of Emperor Duzong of Song

Quan